Muricinae is a taxonomic subfamily of predatory sea snails, marine gastropod mollusks within the large family Muricidae, the murex snails and rock snails.

The Muricinae represent approximately 780 valid names of fossil (378) and recent (400) species (Merle et al. 2011). This subfamily contains the true Murex, and many other closely related genera.

Systematics 
The subdivision of the Muricidae into subfamilies is mainly based on the work of Bouchet & Rocroi (2005), who combined morphological and molecular data in order to define the Muricinae. However, based on latest knowledge this subfamily might represent a polyphyletic group. Traditional the Muricinae are subdivided into five informal groups, which contain 47 genera and subgenera (Merle et al. 2011):

1. Muricinae (s.s.) group
 Flexopteron Shuto, 1969
 Murex (s.s) Linnaeus, 1758
 M. (Promurex) Ponder & Vokes, 1988
 Haustellum Schumacher, 1817
 Vokesimurex Petuch, 1994
 Siratus Jousseaume, 1880
 Bolinus Pusch, 1837
 Hexaplex (s.s.) Perry, 1811
 H. (Trunculariopsis) Cossmann, 1921
 Muricanthus Swainson, 1840
 Chicoreus (s.s.) Montfort, 1810
 C. (Chicopinnatus) Houart, 1992
 C. (Rhizophorimurex) Oyama, 1950
 C. (Triplex) Perry, 1810
 Chicomurex Arakawa, 1964
 Phyllonotus Swainson, 1833
 Naquetia Jousseaume, 1880

2. Pterynotus-Textilomurex group
 Pterynotus (s.s) Swainson, 1833
 P. (Pterymarchia) Houart, 1995
 Textiliomurex Merle, 2011

3. Basal muricids group
 Timbellus de Gregorio, 1885
 Pterochelus Jousseaume, 1880
 Purpurellus Jousseaume, 1880
 Ponderia Houart, 1986
 Prototyphis Ponder, 1972
 Poirieria (s.s) Jousseaume, 1880
 P. (Actinotrophon) Dall, 1902
 P. (Caelobassus) Stilwell & Zinsmeister, 1992
 P. (Pagodula) Monterosato, 1884
 Paziella (s.s) Jousseaume, 1880
 P. (Bouchetia) Houart & Héros, 2008
 Crassimurex (s.s) Merle, 1990
 C. (Eopaziella) Gürs, 2001
 Harmatia Noszky, 1940
 Gamurex Merle, 2011
 Falsimuricopsis Merle, 2011

4. Calotrophon-Attiliosa group
 Calotrophon (s.s) Hertlein & Strong, 1951
 C. (Acantholabia) Olsson & Harbison, 1953
 C. (Panamurex) Woodring, 1959

The subfamilial place of the last groups should be regarded as provisional.

References 
 Bouchet, P. & Rocroi, J.-P. (2005): Part 2. Working classification of the Gastropoda. Malacologia, 47: 239–283, Ann Arbor. .
 Merle, D., Garrigues, B. & Pointier, J.-P. (2011): Fossil and Recent Muricidae of the World, Part Muricinae. 648 pp., 182 colour plates, ConchBooks, Hackenheim. .

External links

 
Muricidae
Taxa named by Constantine Samuel Rafinesque